AEB may refer to:

Air industry
 Aero Benin (ICAO code: AEB), Benin airline
 Baise Bama Airport, Guangxi, China (IATA code: AEB)

People
 Ambrose E. Burnside, a Union general during the American Civil War
 Andries Brouwer, Dutch mathematician and computer programmer

Technology
 Analog Expansion Bus, a piece of computer hardware
 Auto Exposure Bracketing, a feature on some cameras
 Autonomous Emergency Braking, a safety feature on automobiles (including on lorries and heavy good vehicles)

Other
 Agência Espacial Brasileira, the Brazilian space agency
 American Egg Board, a marketing body
 Associated Examining Board, an examination board in the UK
 "As evidenced by" (aeb or AEB), often used in medical charting
 Tunisian Arabic language (ISO 639 code: aeb)
 Annual Egyptological Bibliography, bibliography of Egyptology publications
 Afrikaner Eenheidsbeweging, small South African political party